Daniel Beaty (born December 28, 1975) is an American actor, singer, writer, composer and poet. Beaty is known for his blend of music, movement, and words in such original works as Emergence-See and Through The Night.

Early life 
Daniel Beaty holds a BA with Honors in English & Music from Yale University (1998). Upon graduating, Beaty was awarded the Louis Sudler Prize for Excellence in the Arts. During his undergrad, Beaty was granted a production at The Yale Cabaret. His original two-person play on the life of Paul Robeson remained the highest grossing production at the Yale Cabaret for several years.
 
Beaty holds an MFA in Acting from the American Conservatory Theater (ACT) in San Francisco. While training as an actor, Beaty was also pursued a course of study as a playwright and performance artist, performing productions of his solo plays.

Career

Theatre
As an actor, singer, and poet, Daniel has worked throughout the U.S., Europe, and Africa performing on television, acting in theatrical productions, singing leading roles in operas, and giving solo concerts of his own work. He has performed at The White House and has graced the stage of The Kennedy Center in tribute to Ruby Dee and Ossie Davis. Daniel is the 2004 Grand Slam Champion at the world-famous Nuyorican Poet's Café and The Fox Networks National Redemption Slam Champion. He has performed on programs with artists such as Jill Scott, Sonia Sanchez, MC Lyte, Mos Def, Tracy Chapman, Deepak Chopra, and Phylicia Rashad.

His critically acclaimed solo play Emergency (formerly Emergence-SEE!) directed by Kenny Leon ran off-Broadway to a sold-out, extended run at The Public Theater in the fall of 2006. For this production, he received the 2007 Obie Award for Excellence in Off-Broadway Theater for Writing & Performing and the 2007 AUDELCO Award for Solo Performance. New York magazine awarded him a 2007 Culture Award for Best in Theater. Daniel has toured Emergency nationally and internationally. He is the recipient of the 2007 Scotsman Fringe First Award for the best new writer at the Edinburgh Festival and was presented with a Lamplighter Award from the Black Leadership Forum in Washington D.C. In February 2008, he received two Helen Hayes Award nominations for the best in theater in Washington D.C. and in June 2008, he was the winner of the Unique Theatrical Experience Award from the New Jersey Star Ledger for his production at the Crossroads Theater Company in New Brunswick, New Jersey. In the spring of 2008, Emergency had a sold-out seven-week engagement at the Geffen Playhouse in Los Angeles. This production was directed by Charles Randolph-Wright and was awarded two 2009 NAACP Theater Awards including Best Actor. He was awarded the 2007-08 AETNA American Voices Playwright-in-Residence position at Hartford Stage, and a commission to write a new play. His play Resurrection received its world premiere production at Arena Stage in Washington D.C. in August 2008 (where he was awarded the 2008 Edgerton Foundation's new American Play Award); followed by engagements at Hartford Stage, the Philadelphia Theatre Company, and ETA Theater in Chicago.

His critically acclaimed solo show Through the Night ran off-Broadway in 2010 at the Union Square Theatre produced by Daryl Roth. For this performance Daniel has received the 2010 NAACP Theater Award for Best Solo Show, 2010 Audelco Award for Solo Performance and the 2010 Ovation Award for Best Leading Actor in a Play. He also received Drama Desk, Outer Critics Circle, and Drama League Nominations.

Theater Communications Group awarded Daniel the 2011 Peter Slenderize Memorial Award that recognizes an individual or organization whose work exemplifies pioneering practices in theatre, are dedicated to the freedom of expression, and are unafraid of taking risks for the advancement of the art form.

His new solo play Mr. Joy appeared at the Riverside Theatre in May 2012. Daniel is currently developing a new play on the life of Paul Robeson – THE TALLEST TREE IN THE FOREST - directed by Moises Kaufman, as well as a musical on the life of Roland Hayes entitled BREATH & IMAGINATION, directed by Sheryl Kaller.

Daniel has also written a Spoken World Ballet Far But Close that will premiere in the 2012/13 season for Dance Theater of Harlem.

Daniel is currently an artist in residence at ArtsEmerson in Boston, MA.

Film
Daniel was seen on the third and fourth seasons of HBO's Russell Simmons Presents Def Poetry; as a guest artist on NBC's Showtime at the Apollo with Rueben Studdard; and on BET's 106 & Park.

In addition to his writing for the stage, Daniel was hired by Showtime to create an original half-hour series based on his play Emergency and by Spitfire Pictures to create an original screenplay about the life of George Moses Horton, an African-American poet born into slavery.

Music
In October 2008, Daniel collaborated with composer and violinist Daniel Bernard Roumain on an orchestral work titled Darwin's Meditation for the People of Lincoln that premiered at the BAM Next Wave Festival and continues to tour nationally and internationally. His family musical Trippin’ was optioned by Disney and produced by Harlem Stage. Breath & Imagination, Daniel's new musical about the life of Roland Hayes, the first African-American classical vocalist of world renown, recently received a reading at the York Theater.

Teacher
Post graduate school, Beaty began teaching acting, singing and writing in Brooklyn, Harlem, and the Bronx. Here Beaty began to focus his work- questioning the world we live in, the challenges people face, and what's to come of this world in the future.

Daniel is currently an Adjunct Professor in the Graduate School of the Arts at Columbia University.

Author
Both Emergency and Through the Night have are published by Samuel French and available online.

His first children's book based on his poem Knock Knock was released by Little Brown Books in 2013.

References

External links
 
 
 Daniel Beaty at Internet Off-Broadway Database

1975 births
Living people
Place of birth missing (living people)